The Scout Movement in Spain consists of about 30 independent associations, most of them active on the regional level. Due to the regionalisation of Spain, even the larger nationwide associations are divided into regional sub-associations with individual emblems, uniforms and Scout programs.

Associations
Spanish Scout associations are divided in three organizational groups:
Associations affiliated to the World Organization of the Scout Movement (WOSM)
Associations affiliated to the World Association of Girl Guides and Girl Scouts (WAGGGS)
Independent organizations, including a number of members of the smaller international umbrella organizations.

WOSM member organizations
The Federación de Escultismo en España is the National Scout Organization within WOSM. It serves 58,744 Scouts (as of 2004) and consists of three member organizations:
Federación de Scouts-Exploradores de España (full member; interreligious; ASDE)); its sub-associations include
Scouts de Canarias
Movimiento Scout Católico (full member; Catholic; MSC)
Federació Catalana d'Escoltisme i Guiatge (observer; Federation of Catalan Scouts and Guides); its member organizations are
Acció Escolta de Catalunya (interreligious; also affiliated to ASDE; WOSM-Member only)
Escoltes Catalans (secular)
Minyons Escoltes i Guies Sant Jordi de Catalunya (Catholic).

WAGGGS member organizations
Spanish Guiding is affiliated to WAGGGS via the Comité de Enlace del Guidismo en España, an umbrella federation serving 7.154 members (as of 2003). The Comité has two member organizations; both are again umbrella federations:
Federación Española de Guidismo
Asociación Guías de Aragón
Associació Guiatge Valenciá
Escoltes i Guies de Mallorca
Euskal Eskaut Gia Elkartea
Federació Catalana d'Escoltisme i Guiatge
Escoltes Catalans
 Minyons Escoltes i Guies de Catalunya

Independent Scout organizations
Independent (or non-aligned) Scout organizations in Spain include:
Asociación Española de Guías y Scouts de Europa (500 members; Catholic); affiliated to the Union Internationale des Guides et Scouts d'Europe
WFIS en España; affiliated to the World Federation of Independent Scouts; with three regional members:
Associació Catalana de Scouts
Asociación de Scouts Independientes de Madrid
Asociación Galega de Escultismo, Breogán Scouts
Asociación de Guías y Scouts ASA - Andalucía
Federación de Asociaciones Scouts Baden-Powell
Asociación Juvenil De Escultismo Andaluz
Centre Marista d'Escoltes
Federación Scout Regional de Madrid

Past organizations

Scouts Hispanos

Scouts Hispanos was a Spanish Catholic Scouting organization created in Madrid by the priest Jesús Martínez in 1934, which had some social impact and was adopted in other cities, but was cut short with the advent of the Spanish Civil War.

International Scout and Guide units in Spain
Boy Scouts of America, served by the Transatlantic Council in Madrid and Rota
Girlguiding UK, served by British Guides in Foreign Countries
Girl Scouts of the USA, served by USAGSO headquarters
The Scout Association served by British Scouting Overseas, operates units in Fuengirola and Madrid
Scouts et Guides de France operates one group in Barcelona

Emblems

Scout-like organizations
Organización Juvenil Española

See also

Scouts de España

References

External links
Federation of Scouting in Spain - official website
Federacion Española de Guidismo - official website